The 1955 Belgian motorcycle Grand Prix was the fifth round of the 1955 Grand Prix motorcycle racing season. It took place on 3 July 1955 at the Circuit de Spa-Francorchamps.

500 cc classification

350 cc classification

Sidecar classification

References

Belgian motorcycle Grand Prix
Belgian
Motorcycle Grand Prix